Musa Ukungilandela is a studio album from Juluka, a South African band led by England-born Johnny Clegg and the Zulu Sipho Mchunu.

It was produced by Hilton Rosenthal and released in 1984, at a time when South Africa was under apartheid, which banned inter-racial bands. The album was the first to include what would later be called "Zulu rock", and marks the first time the artists used synthesizers.

The song Ibhola Lethu featured soccer game commentaries from Nelson Nkululeko Guimede.

The album was also the last collaboration between Johnny and Sipho for 13 years. Sipho, who had a number of wives and children, decided to return to his farm with his family. Johnny Clegg would then form another band, Savuka, which would catapult him to international fame, but the two artists would finally reunite in 1997 for a new album, Crocodile Love.

Track listing
"Nans'Impi"
"Zodwa"
"Izinhlobo Nezinhlobo Zabantu"
"Thoko"
"Akanaki Nokunaka"
"Trouble Musa Ukungilandela"
"Wangizonda"
"Kancane Kancane"
"Ngeke"
"Ibhola Lethu"

Personnel
 Johnny Clegg - vocals, guitar
 Sipho Mchunu - guitar, percussion, vocals
 Gary Van Zyl - bass guitar, percussion, vocals
 Derek de Beer - drums, percussion, vocals
 Cyril Mnculwane - keyboards, vocals
 Scorpion Madondo - flute, saxophone, vocals

Juluka albums
1984 albums